Q&A is an interview series on the C-SPAN network that typically airs every Sunday night. It is hosted by C-SPAN founder Brian Lamb. Its stated purpose is to feature discussions with "interesting people who are making things happen in politics, the media, education, and science & technology in hour-long conversations about their lives and their work."

List of C-SPAN Q&A interviews first aired in 2004 and 2005
List of C-SPAN Q&A interviews first aired in 2006
List of C-SPAN Q&A interviews first aired in 2007
List of C-SPAN Q&A interviews first aired in 2008
List of C-SPAN Q&A interviews first aired in 2009
List of C-SPAN Q&A interviews first aired in 2010
List of C-SPAN Q&A interviews first aired in 2011
List of C-SPAN Q&A interviews first aired in 2012

References

External links
Official Q&A archives